Victoria Square is a residential skyscraper complex and wider town centre redevelopment project in Woking, Surrey. Upon topping out in September 2019, Tower 1 of the complex became the tallest building in Woking, overtaking Export House. Construction commenced in June 2017 and, following delays related to the COVID-19 pandemic, is due to be completed in August 2022. The total construction cost of the project was £700 million.

Victoria Square was constructed on the site of a seven-storey office building known as Circle 7, on a site bounded by Victoria Way to the west, the railway line leading to Woking railway station to the south, and Woking town centre to the east and north. Three towers were constructed as part of the development. The two buildings taller than  make Woking the smallest settlement in the United Kingdom to have a skyscraper.

Additional construction as part of the Victoria Square development included a plant-covered multistorey car park containing the tallest spiral ramps in the United Kingdom, a ground-level shopping centre extension named Victoria Place (formerly The Peacocks) linked to the nearby High Street, a flagship Marks & Spencer food hall in the ground floor of Tower 1, new bus stops at the western end of the High Street Link Road, and public spaces including a square.

During Storm Aurore on 20 October 2021, three cladding panels from the under construction Hilton Hotel blew away from the façade of the building and fell to the street; there were no injuries. Victoria Way was closed as a precaution until February 2022 while more than 2,000 cladding panels on the hotel received additional reinforcement, further delaying construction of Victoria Square.

Notes

References 

Buildings and structures in Surrey
Residential skyscrapers in England